10th Anniversary may refer to:
 10th anniversary, a wedding anniversary
 10th Anniversary (Sash! album)
 10th Anniversary (The Statler Brothers album)
 10th Anniversary: Platinum Remixes, a compilation album by K.Maro
 10th Anniversary: Rap-A-Lot Records, a compilation album by Rap-a-Lot Records
 10th Anniversary (novel), a book in the Women's Murder Club (book series) by James Patterson

See also
 10th Anniversary Album (disambiguation)